The 2022–23 season is the 113th season in the history of C.S. Marítimo and their 30th consecutive season in the top flight. The club are participating in the Primeira Liga, the Taça de Portugal, and the Taça da Liga.

Players

Other players under contract

Out on loan

Transfers

Pre-season and friendlies

Competitions

Overall record

Primeira Liga

League table

Results summary

Results by round

Matches 
The league fixtures were announced on 5 July 2022.

Taça de Portugal

Taça da Liga

References

C.S. Marítimo seasons
Marítimo